The Gay Bride is a 1934 black-and-white gangster screwball comedy starring Carole Lombard as a wisecracking gold-digger and Chester Morris as the poor man she despises. It was directed by Jack Conway and written by the husband-and-wife team of Sam and Bella Spewak, based on the story "Repeal" by Charles Francis Coe.

Plot
Gold-digging chorus girl Mary (Carole Lombard) marries the head of a bootlegging syndicate, gangster "Shoots" Magiz (Nat Pendleton), but his illegal liquor business goes down the drain when Prohibition is repealed, and Shoots is knocked off by rival Daniel Dingle (Sam Hardy).

Mary, looking for a new sugar daddy, hooks up with Dingle, and when Dingle is removed from the scene by Mickey "The Greek" Mikapopoulis (Leo Carrillo), transfers her attention to him in return for a "trust fund."

All the time, fast-talking straight-shooter Jimmy "Office Boy" Burnham (Chester Morris), Shoots' former bodyguard and errand boy, has looked after Mary, passing her advice and snappy remarks whenever needed. In the end, Mary and Office Boy end up together but only after "Merry Widow Mary" gives away all the dirty money she was given.

Cast

 Carole Lombard as Mary Magiz
 Chester Morris as Jimmy "Office Boy" Burnham
 ZaSu Pitts as Mirabelle
 Leo Carrillo as Mickey "The Greek" Mikapopoulis
 Nat Pendleton as William T. "Shoots" Magiz
 Walter Walker as MacPherson, the lawyer

Cast notes
 Eddie "Rochester" Anderson has a small uncredited part as a bootblack.
 Veteran character actor Gene Lockhart also has a small part as a crooked politician, Jim Smiley.

Production
The Gay Bride began shooting on 20 September 1934 and finished on 23 October. It used the working title of "Repeal", which was the title of the short story by Charles Francis Coe it was based on, which had been published in the Saturday Evening Post at the end of 1933. The title refers to the repeal of Prohibition, which ruined the business of the bootlegger played by Nat Pendelton.

When casting the film, Jean Harlow was considered for the female lead, and Clark Gable, Lyle Talbot, Ricardo Cortez, Russell Hardie and Richard Arlen for the male lead. For the role played by ZaSu Pitts, Una Merkel and Isabel Jewell were considered.  MGM ended up borrowing Lombard from Paramount Pictures for the film, the only one she was to make for the studio, despite her non-exclusive contract with Paramount that allowed her to work wherever she wanted in Hollywood.

Reception
The film was released in the United States on 14 December 1934, and did not earn praise from the critics, nor was it successful at the box office.  Variety wrote thatGangster pictures are gone, and this one won’t do anything to bring them back. It’ll do more to consign them permanently to Davey Jones’ locker down where [box office] grosses don’t count. It deals with hoodlums in a post-prohibition era, but fails to freshen up the story and the conventional means taken to carry it out.Photoplay commented that the film was "A good story loaded with plot complications and blurry character drawings. Even ZaSu Pitts seems more bewildered than usual." Lombard considered the picture one of her worst, and co-star Chester Morris was aware that the film was a "turkey" while they were filming it.

Notes

External links
 
 
 
 

1934 films
American black-and-white films
1930s English-language films
Films directed by Jack Conway
Films about organized crime in the United States
Metro-Goldwyn-Mayer films
American crime comedy films
1930s crime comedy films
1934 comedy films
1930s American films